The SIAI S.12 was an Italian 1910s reconnaissance flying boat, and later Schneider Trophy racer.

Design and development
The Societa Idrovolanti Alta Italia (SIAI) refined the design of the SIAI S.9 into the SIAI S.12 a single-engined biplane reconnaissance-bomber flying boat. It had a deep, contoured forward hull with a slim tapered rear section. The Italian Navy was not interested and no orders were placed.

Operational history
The aircraft was used for the 1920 Schneider Trophy race, where it was known as the Savoia S.12. The contest was won by Italy as Great Britain had withdrawn from the race. Lt. Luigi Bolgna was the only pilot to complete the race in the Savioa S-12, achieving a speed of 107 mph (172.6 km/h). The aircraft achieved a maximum speed of 138 mph (222 km/h) on 7 January 1921.

Specifications (S.12)

See also

References

S.12
1910s Italian military reconnaissance aircraft
Schneider Trophy
Flying boats
Military aircraft of World War I
Biplanes
Single-engined pusher aircraft
Aircraft first flown in 1918